"No Me Dejes Solo", is a 2004 single by Daddy Yankee. It features Wisin & Yandel and Glory.

Charts

References

2004 songs
Wisin & Yandel songs
Spanish-language songs
Daddy Yankee songs
Songs written by Daddy Yankee
Songs written by Wisin
Songs written by Yandel
Interscope Records singles
2005 singles